De Berardinis, de Berardinis or Di Berardinis is a surname of Italian origin.

Notable people with the name include:

Leo de Berardinis (1940–2008), Italian stage actor and theatre director
Michael Di Berardinis, American public official in Pennsylvania 
Olivia De Berardinis (b. 1948), American painter and illustrator
Rosetta DeBerardinis, American artist
Willie Dennis, born William DeBerardinis, American jazz trombonist

Italian-language surnames